William Rogers is an American voice actor who primarily worked in the New York area for several years before moving to Los Angeles in 2015.

He has done work for various studios such as DuArt Film and Video, Ocon Animation Studios, Headline Studios, New Generation Pictures and Bang Zoom! Entertainment.

Career
Rogers began his voice over career in 2001, with the anime series Assemble Insert.

He has worked on various dubs, and in stage productions, including Boogiepop Phantom as Anno, Cells at Work! as Pseudomonas Aeruginosa,
Comic Party as Otaku, Genshiken as Tanaka Soichiro, Gokudo as Soldier, His and Her Circumstances as Pero Pero and Mr. Arima, Hunter x Hunter (2011) as Meleoron and Majitani, Ikki Tousen: Dragon Destiny as Gakushuu, Narrator and Toutasu, To Heart as Imai, Ikki Tousen: Xtreme Xecutor as Red Dragon Sousou and Shuhou, K.O. Beast as Shaba and Kuroko's Basketball as Shinsuke Kimura.

Rogers is best known for voicing Tohma Seguchi in Gravitation and for voicing Brock, Drew and various other characters in the English dub of the long running anime series Pokémon, since Season 9.

Other characters he voiced including Old Mage and Vuan in Legend of Lemnear, All Back-Man, Groribas and Tongue Stretcher in One-Punch Man, Bruno in Pokémon Generations, Elf Elder in Queen's Blade, Kanata Myouken in Shingu: Secret of the Stellar Wars, Various characters in The Third: The Girl with the Blue Eye and Wheeljack in Transformers: War for Cybertron Trilogy.

He has also provided various character voices in numerous video games, including Bullet Witch, Red M&M and Yellow M&M in M&M's Kart Racing and M&M's Adventure, Lucario, Bonsly and Weavile in Super Smash Bros. Brawl, Heathcliff in Heathcliff: The Fast and the Furriest, Urien in Street Fighter V, King Rhoam Bosphoramus Hyrule in The Legend of Zelda: Breath of the Wild, Victor Franson in Dark Rose Valkyrie, and Dredge and Dark Lord Torvald in Paladins.

In addition to voice acting, he is also a voice director and a scriptwriter.

Filmography

Anime
 Assemble Insert – Prime Minister, Additional voices
 Boogiepop Phantom – Anno, Officer Yamamoto, Takashi, Yasushi Sanada
 Cells at Work! – Pseudomonas Aeruginosa
 Comic Party – Otaku
 Genshiken – Tanaka Soichiro
 Gokudo – Soldier
 Gravitation – Tohma Seguchi
 His and Her Circumstances – Pero Pero, Mr. Arima, Additional voices
 Hunter x Hunter (2011) – Meleoron, Majitani
 Ikki Tousen: Dragon Destiny – Gakushuu, Narrator, Toutasu
 Ikki Tousen: Xtreme Xecutor – Red Dragon Sousou, Shuhou
 K.O. Beast – Shaba
 Kuroko's Basketball - Shinsuke Kimura, Itsuku Matsumoto
 Legend of Lemnear – Old Mage, Vuan
 One-Punch Man – All Back-Man, Groribas, Tongue Stretcher
 Pokémon –  Brock, Drew, Ghetsis, Scott, Magikarp salesman, Dome Ace Tucker, Additional voices
 Pokémon Generations – Bruno
 Queen's Blade – Elf Elder
 Shingu: Secret of the Stellar Wars – Kanata Myouken
 The Third: The Girl with the Blue Eye – Various characters
 To Heart – Imai
 Transformers: War for Cybertron Trilogy – Wheeljack

Non-anime
 Elerctro Cute! – Announcer, Booklet, Yarn Dog 
 The Frappinos – Nevillea Kirn
 Never Among Friends – Restaurant Patron (uncredited)
 Robot Trains – Kay
 Tarchin and Friends – Kakule

Film
 Pokémon Ranger and the Temple of the Sea – Brock, Sceptile, Corphish
 Pokémon: The Rise of Darkrai – Brock, Sudowoodo, Croagunk, Darkrai
 Pokémon: Giratina & the Sky Warrior – Brock, Chimchar, Sudowoodo, Croagunk
 Pokémon: Arceus and the Jewel of Life – Brock, Monferno, Sudowoodo, Croagunk
 Pokémon: Zoroark: Master of Illusions – Brock, Infernape, Sudowoodo, Croagunk
 Pokémon the Movie: Kyurem vs. the Sword of Justice – Stunfisk
 Pokémon the Movie: Genesect and the Legend Awakened – Stunfisk
 Pet Pals in Windland – Cuncun
 Pokémon the Movie: I Choose You! – Lucario, Additional voices
 Godzilla: Planet of the Monsters – Additional voices
 Pokémon the Movie: The Power of Us – Sudowoodo, Additional voices
 Pokémon: Mewtwo Strikes Back—Evolution – Brock
 Pororo: Cyberspace Adventures Poby, Crong (voice, uncredited)
 Pororo, the Snow Fairy Village Adventure Poby, Crong, Lava Monster (voice, uncredited)

Video games

Production credits

Voice director
 Queen's Blade: Beautiful Warriors
 Trillion: God of Destruction
 Mai Mai Miracle (Assistant Voice Direction)

Script adaptation
 Street Fighter V
 Trillion: God of Destruction

Producer
The Frappinos
Dark Passages

References

External links
Official Website

Living people
American male voice actors
American male video game actors
American voice directors
20th-century American male actors
21st-century American male actors
Place of birth missing (living people)
Year of birth missing (living people)